Franciszek Rosłaniec (19 December 1899 - 1942) was a Polish Catholic priest of the Diocese of Radom and professor of New Testament Exegesis at the University of Warsaw. He was arrested by the Nazis in 1939 and sent to various prisons including Sachsenhausen concentration camp before he was murdered in Dachau concentration camp. He is one of the 108 Blessed Polish Martyrs beatified on 13 June 1999 by Pope John Paul II.

References 

1899 births
1942 deaths
Polish beatified people
Polish people who died in Dachau concentration camp
108 Blessed Polish Martyrs